Tom Reidar Haraldsen (born 29 August 1980) is a Norwegian football defender who is currently without a club.

References

Norwegian footballers
IK Start players
Moss FK players
Viborg FF players
Danish Superliga players
Norwegian expatriate footballers
Bryne FK players
Expatriate men's footballers in Denmark
1980 births
Living people

Association football defenders